Sedgwick County is the name of two counties in the United States:

 Sedgwick County, Colorado
 Sedgwick County, Kansas